Alex & Nilusha is a collaborative project led by percussionist Alex Pertout and vocalist Nilusha Dassenaike which embraces an authentic cross-cultural contemporary sound created and based in Australia but informed by many locations around the globe, including their profound personal Latin American and South Asian roots. They have presented their project in concerts, jazz clubs, festivals, on radio and television in Australia as well as in Singapore, Sri Lanka, Mexico and Cuba.

Their recordings feature an impressive gathering of outstanding national and international guests including legendary US guitarist Mike Stern, Egyptian percussionist Hossam Ramzy, pianist Paul Grabowsky, indigenous singer-songwriter Tom E Lewis, Latin-jazz flautist Dave Valentin, guitarists Leonard Grigoryan, Puerto Rican pianist Edsel Gomez, Cuban tres master Pancho Amat, Cuban violinist William Roblejo and trumpetist Miroslav Bukovsky to name a few.

Their debut album 'Moments in Time' received critical acclaimed including an ABC Jazz 'Album of the Week' and an ABC Jazz Notes 'Top 5 Australian Jazz Albums of 2012' endorsement, while their latest release 'Tales To Tell' recorded in Melbourne, New York, Buenos Aires, London and Havana has received high praise and was awarded the 'Premio Internacional' at the 2015 XIX Cubadisco Music Awards in Havana, Cuba. With an invitation from the 2016 XX Cubadisco Festival Alex & Nilusha returned to Cuba and Mexico in May 2016 presenting music from their brand new album 'Afterglow'. The tour was supported by an Arts Project Grant from the Australia Council for the Arts.

Alex Pertout hails from Santiago, Chile, spent his early teens in Gorizia, Italy, and grew up in Melbourne, where he developed his musical skills, later graduating from the Victorian College of the Arts with High Distinction. He holds an MPhil in Music from the Australian National University. Pertout has recorded on hundreds of albums and motion picture soundtracks. Some of these include number-one-charting albums by Powderfinger and Daryl Braithwaite and soundtracks such as Crocodile Dundee and It Runs in the Family. Pertout is a founding member of the Australian Art Orchestra led by Paul Grabowsky, with whom he has toured extensively nationally and internationally over the last nineteen years. Pertout has produced albums and is the author of Sight Reading: The Rhythm Book published internationally by Mel Bay. He is a senior lecturer in music at the Faculty of VCA and MCM, University of Melbourne.

Nilusha Dassenaike was born in Colombo, Sri Lanka, and arrived in Melbourne, as a five-month-old baby with her family. She studied Fine Art and Music at the Victorian College of the Arts and an MPhil in Music at the Australian National University. Dassenaike has performed extensively in an array of genres with artists such as Don Burrows, James Morrison and Renee Geyer among many others. Dassenaike has worked on television shows such as Australia's Got Talent and Singing Bee. She was featured in the theme song for the series Canal Road. Since 2021, Dassenaike has performed and toured with Tina Arena, including the 2022 performance opening for Billy Joel at the MCG on December 10 2022.

Discography

Albums
Moments in Time (2012) 
Tales To Tell (2014) 
Afterglow (2016)

Singles
"Falling" (ft. Mile Stern) (2013)

References

External links
Alex & Nilusha
Alex Pertout
Nilusha Dassenaike
Record Label Whispering Tree Music

Australian jazz ensembles